The 2019 MTV EMAs (also known as the MTV Europe Music Awards) was held at the FIBES Conference and Exhibition Centre in Seville, Spain, on 3 November 2019. The ceremony's host was Becky G. This was the fourth year, as well as the second consecutive year, that Spain hosted the ceremony. It was also the first time a country hosted back-to-back editions.

Ariana Grande was nominated for seven awards, followed by Billie Eilish, Lil Nas X and Shawn Mendes, who were each nominated for six. BTS won three awards, becoming the most awarded act of the night, followed by Taylor Swift, Halsey and Eilish, who each won two.

In association with the EMAs, an event called MTV Music Week was organised, which run from 31 October to 2 November at different locations throughout the city. Its main concert was held at the Plaza de España on 2 November, headlined by Green Day.

Nominations
Nominees were announced on October 1, 2019. Winners are in bold text.

Regional nominations
Winners are in bold text.

Performances

Appearances
Terry Crews — announcer
Nicole Scherzinger — presented Best Pop
Afrojack and Georgina Rodríguez — presented Best Collaboration
Doutzen Kroes and Paz Vega — presented Best Hip Hop
Joan Smalls and Sway Calloway — presented Best Rock
Halsey — presented Rock Icon
Abraham Mateo and Sofía Reyes — presented Best New
Johnny Orlando and Leomie Anderson — presented Best Video

Most wins and nominations

Most wins

Most nominations

See also
2019 MTV Video Music Awards

References

External links
Official website 

mtv
2019
2019 in Andalusia